The San Diego Music Awards are an awards show held annually in San Diego, California, United States, to recognize the best bands and artists in local music. The awards show benefits the San Diego Music Foundation, a non-profit organization dedicated to promoting San Diego music education programs. Over the years the show has featured awards in a variety of categories covering nearly every genre of music, and featured live performances by such major-label recording artists as Blink-182, Switchfoot, and Jason Mraz, P.O.D. as well as lesser known up-and-coming artists, such as Schizophonics, Trouble in the Wind, Gilbert Castellanos, Whitney Shay and others. In 2021 best Hip-Hop album of the year nominee The Toven released the music video for his single "Sweet Home San Diego" from his "Welcome To San Diego" album which was recorded live at the 30th annual San Diego Music Awards at Humphrey's By The Bay. Bigger Vibes the debut album by The Toven lost to Boston native Van Bates aka Black Hesher's Saints And Sirens album This year's Lifetime Achievement Award went to singer and guitarist Jerry Raney formerly of 1970s psychedelic band Glory.

Through 2019, the annual awards have raised $615,317 for its Taylor Guitars for Schools program, which has provided free instruments and lessons for more than 57,200 students across San Diego County over the past three decades.

References

External links

Official website
NBC San Diego Profile

Culture of San Diego
American music awards
Awards established in 1991
1991 establishments in California